"Skeleton" is the third Japanese single by Super Junior's  sub-group, Donghae & Eunhyuk, released on August 6, 2014, by Avex Trax.

Track listing

DVD
 "Skeleton" music video
 "Skeleton" music video making-of

Chart

Sales
Japanese Version

References

External links
 Official Japanese Avex website of Super Junior Donghae & Eunhyuk

Super Junior songs
Avex Trax singles
2014 songs
2014 singles